Naval Facility Cape Hatteras (NAVFAC Cape Hatteras) was a Sound Surveillance System (SOSUS) shore terminal, one of the nine initial systems installed, located on Cape Hatteras near Buxton, North Carolina and adjacent to the old location of the Cape Hatteras lighthouse. NAVFAC Cape Hatteras, eighth of the initial nine Atlantic systems to be activated, was in commission 11 January 1956 to 30 June 1982. 

The system and shore facilities, in which output of the array at sea was processed and displayed by means of the Low Frequency Analyzer and Recorder (LOFAR), were officially described as being engaged in oceanographic research.  The actual function of undersea surveillance was declassified in 1991 long after the facility had closed. In military construction hearings during 1964 before the Senate Committee on Armed Services the request for funding of recreational and other support buildings for the Naval Facility the Navy noted it was part of a program supporting continental air and missile defense forces without mention of its role in tracking Soviet missile submarines. On 26 June 1962 NAVFAC Cape Hatteras made the first SOSUS detection of a Soviet diesel submarine.

Due to its location on Cape Hatteras, when the facility initially opened, it was only accessibly via ferry from the Oregon Inlet. The ferry discontinued service at night during winter months and there were frequent interruptions due to weather and sea conditions. By 1963 there were 122 Navy personnel and 180 dependents resident at the facility.

United States Coast Guard Group Cape Hatteras occupied some of the facility buildings from 1981 to 2005. The Coast Guard demolished remaining buildings and the site is desirable as beach access and possible construction of changing and rest rooms but contaminated soil requires environmental clean up.

References

1956 establishments in North Carolina
1982 disestablishments in North Carolina
Closed installations of the United States Navy